The Rocky Mountain Research Station (RMRS) is one of five regional units that make up the US Forest Service Research and Development organization — the most extensive natural resources research organization in the world. The station headquarters are located in Fort Collins, Colorado. Research is structured within 8 science program areas. The Station employs over 400 permanent full-time employees, including roughly 100 research scientists.

Research program areas
 Air, Water and Aquatic Environments
 Aldo Leopold Wilderness Research Institute
 Fire, Fuel, and Smoke Science
 Forests and Woodlands Ecosystems Research
 Grassland, Shrubland and Desert Ecosystem
 Human Dimensions
 Inventory, Monitoring and Analysis Science
 Wildlife and Terrestrial Ecosystems

Laboratories
 Forestry Sciences Laboratory, Albuquerque, NM
 Forestry Sciences Laboratory, Bozeman, MT
 Fire Sciences Laboratory, Missoula, MT
 Aquatic Sciences Laboratory, Boise, ID
 Forestry Sciences Laboratory, Flagstaff, AZ
 Headquarters, Fort Collins, CO
 Forestry Sciences Laboratory, Logan, UT
 Forestry Sciences Laboratory, Missoula, MT
 Aldo Leopold Wilderness Research Institute, Missoula, MT
 Forestry Sciences Laboratory, Moscow, ID
 Ogden Service Center, Ogden, UT
 Forestry Sciences Laboratory, Ogden, UT
 Shrub Sciences Laboratory, Provo, UT
 Forestry Sciences Laboratory, Rapid City, SD
 Forestry Sciences Laboratory, University of Nevada, Reno NV

Experimental forests and ranges
 Black Hills Experimental Forest
 Boise Basin Experimental Forest
 Coram Experimental Forest
 Deception Creek Experimental Forest
 Desert Experimental Range
 Fort Valley Experimental Forest
 Fraser Experimental Forest
 Glacier Lakes Ecosystem Experiments Site (GLEES)
 Great Basin Experimental Range
 Long Valley Experimental Forest
 Manitou Experimental Forest
 Priest River Experimental Forest
 Sierra Ancha Experimental Forest
 Tenderfoot Creek Experimental Forest

References

External links
 Rocky Mountain Research Station

Ecology of the Rocky Mountains
Forests of the Rocky Mountains
United States Forest Service
Rocky Mountains
Nature conservation organizations based in the United States